Yeremeyevo is a rural locality (a village) in Abakanovskoye Rural Settlement, Cherepovetsky District, Vologda Oblast, Russia. The population was 1 as of 2002. There are 3 streets.

Geography 
Yeremeyevo is located 33 km northwest of Cherepovets (the district's administrative centre) by road. Mikhaylovo is the nearest rural locality.

References 

Rural localities in Cherepovetsky District